The Clergy fraction is a cross-factional
parliamentary group in the Iranian Parliament which consists of Shia clerics.

Historical membership 
The number of clerics in the Parliament has declined significantly since 1980. According to Yasmin Alem, it is difficult to explain this decline, however, some factors may have played a role in this trend: Popularity of clerics has waved since the new generation of voters has less emotional ties to the revolution, and political factions and coalitions adapted stratagems leading to de-clericalization.

References 

Iranian clerical political groups
Iranian Parliament fractions